Lautaro Roque Formica (born 27 January 1986 in Rosario) is an Argentine football player currently playing for Chacarita Juniors.

Career
Formica played for Newell's Old Boys, San Lorenzo and Godoy Cruz during his first professional years. He joined Huracán in July, 2010.
In 2011, he joined Cerro Porteño of Paraguay.

Personal life

He is the older brother of Mauro Formica, who plays for Newell's Old Boys.

References

External links
 Lautaro Formica – Argentine Primera statistics at Fútbol XXI  
 Official Club Player Profile 

1986 births
Living people
Argentine footballers
Argentine expatriate footballers
Footballers from Rosario, Santa Fe
Argentina under-20 international footballers
Association football defenders
Newell's Old Boys footballers
San Lorenzo de Almagro footballers
Godoy Cruz Antonio Tomba footballers
Club Atlético Huracán footballers
Cerro Porteño players
Asteras Tripolis F.C. players
Guaraní Antonio Franco footballers
Talleres de Córdoba footballers
Villa Dálmine footballers
Deportivo Morón footballers
Estudiantes de Río Cuarto footballers
Chacarita Juniors footballers
Argentine Primera División players
Super League Greece players
Argentine expatriate sportspeople in Paraguay
Argentine expatriate sportspeople in Greece
Expatriate footballers in Paraguay
Expatriate footballers in Greece